An experience point (often abbreviated as exp or XP) is a unit of measurement used in some tabletop role-playing games (RPGs) and role-playing video games to quantify a player character's life experience and progression through the game. Experience points are generally awarded for the completion of missions, overcoming obstacles and opponents, and successful role-playing.

In many RPGs, characters start as fairly weak and untrained. When a sufficient amount of experience is obtained, the character "levels up", achieving the next stage of character development. Such an event usually increases the character's statistics, such as maximum health, magic and strength, and may permit the character to acquire new abilities or improve existing ones. Levelling up may also give the character access to more challenging areas or items.

In some role-playing games, particularly those derived from Dungeons & Dragons, experience points are used to improve characters in discrete experience levels; in other games, such as GURPS and the World of Darkness games, experience points are spent on specific abilities or attributes chosen by the player.

In most games, as the difficulty of the challenge increases, the experience rewarded for overcoming it also increases. As players gain more experience points, the amount of experience needed to gain abilities typically increases. Alternatively, some games keep the number of experience points per level constant but progressively lower the experience gained for the same tasks as the character's level increases. Thus, as the player character strengthens from gaining experience, they are encouraged to accept new tasks that are commensurate with their improved abilities in order to advance.

Types

Level-based progression

In games derived from Dungeons & Dragons (D&D), an accumulation of a sufficient number of experience points (XP) increases a character's "level", a number that represents a character's overall skill and experience. To "level" or "level up" means to gain enough XP to reach the next level. By gaining a level, a character's abilities or stats will increase, making the character stronger and able to accomplish more difficult tasks, including safely battling stronger enemies, gaining access to more powerful abilities (such as spells or combat techniques), and to make, fix or disable more complex mechanical devices, or resolve increasingly difficult social challenges.

Typically, levels are associated with a character class, and many systems allow combinations of classes, allowing a player to customize how their character develops.

Some systems that use a level-based experience system also incorporate the ability to purchase specific traits with a set amount of experience; for example, D&D 3rd Edition bases the creation of magical items around a system of experience expenditure (known as burning xp) and also uses a system of feat selection which closely matches the advantages of systems such as GURPS or the Hero System. The d20 System also introduced the concept of prestige classes which bundle sets of mechanics, character development and requirements into a package which can be "leveled" like an ordinary class.

Some games have a level cap, or a limit of levels available. For example, in the online game RuneScape, no player can currently get higher than level 120 which needs a combined 104,273,167 experience points to gain, nor can any one skill gain more than 200 million experiences.  Some games have a dynamic level cap, where the level cap is dependent upon the levels of the average player (so it gradually increases).

Activity-based progression
In some systems, such as the classic tabletop role-playing games Traveller, Call of Cthulhu and Basic Role-Playing, and the role-playing video games Dungeon Master, Final Fantasy II, The Elder Scrolls, the SaGa series, and Grandia series, progression is based on increasing individual statistics (skills, rank and other features) of the character, and is not driven by the acquisition of (general) experience points. The skills and attributes are made to grow through exercised use. Some authors believe that activity-based progression encourages tedious grinding processes, like intentionally taking damage and attacking allied characters to increase health in Final Fantasy II.

Free-form advancement

Free-form advancement is used by many role-playing systems including GURPS, Hero System or the World of Darkness series. It allows the player to select which skills to advance by allocating "points". Each character attribute is assigned a price to improve, so for example it might cost a character 2 points to raise an archery skill one notch, 10 points to raise overall dexterity by one, or it might cost 20 points to learn a new magic spell.

Players are typically free to spend points however they choose, which greatly increases the control that a player has over the character's development, but also usually causes players to find that complexity increases as well. Some games therefore simplify character creation and advancement by suggesting packages or templates of pre-selected ability sets, so for example a player could have their character become an "investigator" by purchasing a package deal which includes many skills and abilities, rather than buying them each separately.

Cash-in advancement
A cash-in experience advancement system uses experience points to "purchase" such character advancements as class levels, skill points, new skills, feats or increasing saving throw bonuses or base attribute points each of which has a set cost in experience points with set limits on the maximum bonuses that can be purchased at a given time usually once per game session. Once experience points are used thus they are "spent" and are erased from the character record or marked as spent and cannot be used again. Final Fantasy XIII and Warhammer Fantasy Roleplay are examples of games that use a cash-in advancement system.

Hybrid systems
Some games use advancement systems which combine elements from two or more of the above types. For example, in the third edition of Dungeons & Dragons, whenever a level is gained in a character class, it provides a number of skill points (the exact number is calculated based on the class and the character's intelligence statistic), which can be spent to raise various skills. Character level (generally the sum of a character's total levels in all classes) is used to calculate how high skills can be raised, when an ability score can be raised and when a character can gain new feats (a class of special abilities which include special attacks, proficiencies in various weapons and bonuses on the dice rolls used to determine the outcome of various actions) and how many experience points are needed to advance in level. In Ragnarok Online, experience points are divided into two categories: base experience and job experience. Gaining base experience increases a character's base level, which is used to calculate a character's maximum HP and SP, increasing base level also provides points which can be spent to increase stats such as strength, agility and intelligence. Gaining job experience increases a character's job level, each job level provides a skill point which can be spent in the job's skill tree to gain a new ability, such as a spell, special attack or passive bonus, or improve an existing ability.

Video games
Since many early role-playing video games are derived from Dungeons & Dragons, most use a level-based experience system.

In many games, characters must obtain a minimum level to perform certain actions, such as wielding a particular weapon, entering a restricted area, or earning the respect of a non-player character. Some games use a system of "character levels", where higher-level characters hold an absolute advantage over those of lower level. In these games, statistical character management is usually kept to a minimum. Other games use a system of "skill levels" to measure advantages in terms of specific aptitudes, such as weapon handling, spell-casting proficiency, and stealthiness. These games allow the players to customize their characters to a greater extent.

Some games, particularly among MUDs and MMORPGs, place a limit on the experience a character gains from a single encounter or challenge, to reduce the effectiveness of power-leveling.

Perks

"Perks" are special bonuses that video game players can add to their characters to give special abilities.  The term refers to the general usage of "perk" as an abbreviation of "perquisite". Perks are permanent rather than temporary and are progressively unlocked through experience points. The first video game to use the term "perks" to refer to such a mechanic was the 1997 role-playing video game Fallout.

Besides RPGs, perks have been used in various other video games in recent times, including first-person shooters such as Call of Duty 4: Modern Warfare (2007), Call of Duty: Modern Warfare 2 (2009), and Killing Floor (2009), as well as action games such as Metal Gear Online (2008).

Remorting
"Remorting" (also known as "rebirth", "ascending/ascension", "reincarnating", or "new game plus") is a game mechanic in some role-playing games whereby, once the player character reaches a specified level limit, the player can elect to start over with a new version of the character.  The bonuses that are given are dependent on several factors, which generally involve the stats of the character before the reincarnation occurs.  The remorting character generally loses all levels, but gains an advantage that was previously unavailable, usually access to different races, avatars, classes, skills, or otherwise inaccessible play areas within the game.  A symbol often identifies a remorted character.

The term "remort" comes from MUDs, in some of which players may become immortal characters—administrative staff—simply by advancing to the maximum level. These users are generally expected to distance themselves from gameplay, and interaction with players may be severely limited. When an immortal chooses to vacate his or her position to resume playing the game—usually from level one just as with any new character—he or she is said to have remorted, "becoming mortal again". A MUD called Arcane Nites, formerly Nitemare, claims to have created the first remort system and coined the term.

Grinding

Grinding refers to the process of repeating one specific activity over and over. This is done, for example, by repeatedly participating in challenges, quests, tasks and events which reward experience points for performing repetitive, often menial challenges. This definition can also be used in multi-player games, but it is typically displaced by a much more charged meaning. A term intended to describe this style of play without pejorative connotation is optimization, also known as  "XP farming".

Power-leveling
Power-leveling is using the help of another, stronger player to level a character more quickly than is possible alone.

Sharing
Games, that allow several characters participating in a single event (such as battle or quest completion), implement various methods of determining how and when experience gets shared between participants. These methods include: only last-hitting character, whose hit killed the enemy, getting experience (as in Fire Emblem series); unconditionally sharing experience among characters (as in D&D system); and giving experience based on each character's actions (as in Final Fantasy Tactics). In some online games, it is possible to join a group and gain experience, loot or other rewards, while providing little or no contribution to the group. This type of behaviour is referred to as leeching, particularly when it is done without the permission of other group members. In games which allow players to gain rewards by kill stealing, this is also considered a form of leeching. This is extremely common in games such as Dungeon Defenders, in which all players receive the same rewards regardless of their contributions.

Botting

Some players of online games use automated programs known as bots to grind or leech for them in order to progress with minimal effort. This practice often violates the terms of service. Bots are also commonly used in commercial operations in order to powerlevel a character, either to increase the sale value of the account, or to allow the character to be used for commercial gold farming.

See also
 Grinding (gaming)
 Virtual economy
 Virtual world

References

External links

Game terminology
MUD terminology
Player progress tracking in video games
Role-playing game terminology
Video game terminology